Dražen Kutleša (born 25 September 1968) is a Croatian prelate of the Catholic Church who serves as the archbishop coadjutor of Zagreb since 2023. Kutleša briefly served as the archbishop of Split-Makarska from 2022 to 2023 and as the bishop of Poreč-Pula from 2012 to 2020, where he also served as the apostolic administrator from 2020 to 2023. Kutleša is a member of the Dicastery for Bishops and serves as the president of the Episcopal Conference of Croatia since 2022.

A native of Tomislavgrad in Herzegovina, Kutleša was raised in the nearby paternal village of Prisoje, where he attended elementary school. After deciding to become a priest and joining the seminary, Bishop Pavao Žanić of Mostar-Duvno sent him for high school education in Dubrovnik from where he enrolled at the College of Theology of Vrhbosna in Sarajevo in 1987, graduating in 1993 in Bol due to war. The same year he was ordained as a deacon and a priest, and served for two years as a chaplain in Mostar. He continued his education in 1995 at the Pontifical Urban University, studying canon law, eventually earning his Ph.D. in 2001. From 2000 he served as the bishop's secretary and from 2003 he was a parish administrator in Grude and a lecturer of law at the Theological Institute of Mostar. In 2006, at the request of Cardinal Giovanni Battista Re, Kutleša became a member of the Congregation for Bishops and in 2011 also an associate of the Congregation for Divine Worship and the Discipline of the Sacraments.

The same year, he was appointed the bishop coadjutor of Poreč-Pula, and after the resignation of Ivan Milovan in 2012, he became the bishop. He served there for eight years, until 2020 when he was appointed the archbishop coadjutor of Split-Makarska. In 2022, Kutleša succeeded Marin Barišić as the archbishop of Split-Makarska. Serving as the archbishop of Split-Makarska for only ten months, Kutleša was appointed the archbishop coadjutor of Zagreb to succeed Josip Bozanić in February 2023.

Early life 

Dražen Kutleša was born in Duvno, present-day Tomislavgrad in Bosnia and Herzegovina to father Krešo and mother Danica née Ćurić, both from the village of Prisoje. His father was, like many men from his region, a gastarbeiter in Austria and West Germany. Thus, he and his brother Grgo were raised by their mother Danica. Dražen was christened in the village church of the Assumption of the Blessed Virgin Mary. Dražen, known as a lively child, attended the village elementary school from 1975 to 1983. He made a decision to become a priest, to which his mother was opposed at first. Nevertheless, Bishop Pavao Žanić accepted him into seminary and sent him to Ruđer Bošković Gymnasium in Dubrovnik, where he studied from 1983 until graduation in June 1987. In 1987, Kutleša enrolled at the College of Theology of Vrhbosna in Sarajevo, spending his last academic year of 1992/93 in Bol on the isle of Brač. At the time, the College of Theology of Vrhbosna was a branch of the Catholic Faculty of Theology, University of Zagreb. He graduated with the thesis Od konstitucije 'Romanos Pontifices' (1881.) do dekreta 'Romanis Pontificibus' (1975.) under mentorship of Ratko Perić. His brother Grgo joined the Croatian Army and currently lives in Split, Croatia and works for the Croatian Ministry of Defence.

Priesthood 

While in Bol, Kutleša was ordained as a deacon on 13 March 1993 by Bishop Pavao Žanić, and was ordained as a priest in his home village also by Žanić on 29 June 1993. He chose Ps 86,12 "I will praise thee, O Lord my God, with all my heart: and I will glorify thy name forevermore" as his priestly motto and celebrated his first mass in Prisoje on 25 July 1993. From 1993 to 1995, Kutleša was a chaplain in the Mostar cathedral and taught religious education in Gimnazija Mostar. In 1995, he was sent to study canon law at the Pontifical Urban University in Rome with a stipend from the Congregation for the Evangelization of Peoples and living in the premises of the Society of St. Peter the Apostle. He earned his master's degree with the thesis I rapporti tra il Vescovo diocesano e i Religiosi nell'attività apostolica della Diocesi secondo il C.I.C. (cann. 678-683). He spent the academic year 1996/97 studying administrative practice at the Congregation for the Clergy. In the next academic year, Kutleša passed the exams necessary to enroll in postgraduate studies in canon law. From 1998, he wrote his dissertation mostly while living in Mostar and working for the diocese. In the same year, Kutleša was appointed the vice chancellor of the diocese and in 2000 he became personal secretary to Perić, who succeeded Žanić as the bishop of Mostar-Duvno. On 18 June 2001, Kutleša earned his Ph.D. after defending his dissertation in front of Vittorio Pio Pinto, now a judge of the Roman Rota, the highest court of the Catholic Church. In 2003, he published parts of his dissertation in Mostar in Italian language titled Il Triangolo: i Frati Francescani OFM, il Vescovo diocesano e il Clero diocesano nella Diocesi di Mostar-Duvno dal 1881 al 1975 alla luce dei cinque più importanti documenti. In 2003, Kutleša was appointed a parish administrator in Grude. The parish, nominally under diocesan administration, was usurped by three suspended Franciscan friars. At the same time, he lectured law at the Theological Institute of Mostar.

Cardinal Giovanni Battista Re, prefect of the Congregation for Bishops, asked the bishop to put Kutleša for disposition to the Congregation. Kutleša joined the Congregation on 1 April 2006. From February 2011, Kutleša was also an associate of the Congregation for Divine Worship and the Discipline of the Sacraments for the cases of giving forgiveness from hard and unconsummated marriage. On 13 May 2011, the Pope gave him the title of monsignor.

Episcopate

Poreč-Pula 

On 17 October 2011, Pope Benedict XVI named Kutleša the bishop coadjutor of Poreč-Pula with special powers in Croatia. He was consecrated in Euphrasian Basilica in Poreč on 10 December 2011 by Cardinal Marc Ouellet as the principal consecrator and the bishops Ivan Milovan of Poreč-Pula and Perić of Mostar-Duvno as the co-consecrators. He took Archbishop of Zagreb Cardinal Aloysius Stepinac's episcopal motto "In Thee, O Lord, have I hoped". Kutleša's appointment occurred amidst a dispute over the ownership of the real estate in the parish of Dajla between the Italian Benedictines and the Diocese of Poreč-Pula. The special powers granted to Kutleša related to the dispute over Dajla as well.

The Italian Benedictines filed lawsuits both to the church authorities and the Municipal Court in Buje (later joined to the Municipal Court in Pula). They had the strong support of the Holy See. A three-member Church commission, including the Archbishop of Zagreb Josip Bozanić, made a decision favouring the Benedictines. Milovan refused to sign the agreement, so the Holy See appointed Cardinal Santos Abril y Castelló as a special signator in Milovan's name. The agreement put the Diocese at risk of bankruptcy. Milovan sought support from the Croatian government. So in August 2011, the Minister of Justice Dražen Bošnjaković declared the return of the real estate to the Church as invalid and took it under state ownership, with an explanation that the return of the property to the Church was invalid as the real owners in Italy have already been compensated, and the property never belonged to the Diocese in the first place. The Papal Secretary of State sued Croatia in the name of the local parish and in April 2013 the High Administrative Court of Croatia annulled the decision of the Ministry. The new Croatian government led by Zoran Milanović promised not to be involved in what they considered to be inter-church relations.

On 14 June 2012, Milovan was forced to request his retirement and was succeeded by Kutleša, his coadjutor. However, just when the commission's decision was supposed to take effect, the new Pope Francis was elected on 13 March 2013, and the State Secretary Tarcisio Bertone who supported the Benedictines was dismissed on 15 October 2013. In 2015, the Municipal Court of Pula ruled against the Benedictines, dismissing their lawsuit, a decision confirmed by the County Court of Pula after the appeal. Journalist Darko Pavičić writes that since Kutleša took over the episcopacy, the destiny of the ecclesiastical process over the Dajla dispute remained unknown, and considering that the Diocese sruvived financially, Pavičić writes that Kutleša resolved the inter-church conflict between the Benedictines and the Diocese.

Split-Makarska 

On 11 June 2020, Pope Francis named Kutleša the archbishop coadjutor of Split-Makarska. Kutleša was installed in the Cathedral of Saint Domnius in Split on 3 September 2020. As his previous diocese remained vacant, the Pope appointed him the apostolic administrator there the same day. Kutleša became the archbishop when Marin Barišić retired on 13 May 2022.

On 13 July 2022, the Pope appointed Kutleša a member of the Dicastery for Bishops. On 18 October 2022, he was elected to succeded Želimir Puljić as the president of the Episcopal Conference of Croatia for a five-year term.

Zagreb 

After serving as the archbishop of Split-Makarska for only ten months, on 14 February 2023, the Pope appointed Kutleša the archbishop coadjutor of Zagreb. The same day, Puljić was appointed as the apostolic administrator of Split-Makarska.

Footnotes

References

News articles

Websites 

 

1968 births
Living people
People from Tomislavgrad
Croats of Bosnia and Herzegovina
University of Zagreb alumni
Pontifical Urban University alumni
20th-century Bosnia and Herzegovina Roman Catholic priests
21st-century Bosnia and Herzegovina Roman Catholic priests
Bishops of Poreč-Pula
Archbishops of Split-Makarska
Members of the Congregation for Bishops
Bishops appointed by Pope Benedict XVI
Bishops appointed by Pope Francis
21st-century Roman Catholic archbishops in Croatia